Snøtoa Terrace is a flattish, ice-covered terrace on the northeast side of Mount Grytøyr in the Mühlig-Hofmann Mountains of Queen Maud Land. It was mapped from surveys and air photos by the Norwegian Antarctic Expedition (1956–60) and named Snøtoa ("the snow patch").

References

Plateaus of Antarctica
Landforms of Queen Maud Land
Princess Martha Coast